Pendria is a genus of moths in the subfamily Lymantriinae. The genus was erected by Charles Swinhoe in 1906.

Species
Pendria rinaria (Moore, [1860]) Java, Sumatra
Pendria rotundata Swinhoe, 1906 Nias in Indonesia
Pendria dica (Swinhoe, 1891) Khasi Hills of India

References

Lymantriinae